Silent Scope is a series of rail shooter video games that are developed and published by Konami.

Games

Silent Scope (1999)

Silent Scope 2 (2000)

Silent Scope EX (2001)

Silent Scope EX was released in the arcades in 2001. It was included with Silent Scope 3 for the PlayStation 2 and Silent Scope Complete for the Xbox.

Silent Scope 3 (2002)

Silent Scope Complete (2004)

Silent Scope Complete is a compilation in the Silent Scope video game series released for Xbox. All four games in the compilation play exactly the same, but it also adds in additional levels, story branches and features.

Silent Scope: Bone-Eater (2014)

Silent Scope: Bone-Eater is a rail shooter developed by tri-Ace and published by Konami, released for arcades in 2014. It is the 5th game in the Silent Scope series, not counting Silent Scope Complete.

Bone-Eater plays similarly to previous entries, but features a new anime-like art style.

References

External links
Silent Scope EX at the Killer List of Videogames
Silent Scope EX at PrimeTime Amusements

Konami franchises
Light gun games
Rail shooters
Sniper video games
Video game franchises
Video game franchises introduced in 1999
Video games about terrorism